Michael's Virgin Land Nature Reserve is a protected nature reserve of Ukraine that covers meadow-steppe and forest-steppe in the northeast of Ukraine near the border with Russia.  It exhibits plants found in both northern and southern steppes.  First created as a reserve in 1928, it was expanded over the years and formally upgraded to a national reserve in 2009.  The reserve is in the administrative districts of Lebedyn and Nedryhailiv of Sumy Oblast.

Topography
The reserve is relatively flat in the uplands of northeast Ukraine, in the watershed of the Sula River and the Grun River.  It is the remnant of what was formerly a large virgin grassland.  The main body of the reserve is in the middle of the district, with several small satellite sites of 40-100 hectares each scattered around the vicinity to protect other remnant meadow-steppe plots.

Climate and ecoregion
The climate of the reserve is Humid continental climate, warm summer (Köppen climate classification (Dfb)).

The reserve is located in the East European forest steppe ecoregion, a transition zone between the broadleaf forests of the north and the grasslands to the south.. This ecoregion is characterized by a mosaic of forests, steppe, and riverine wetlands.

Flora and fauna
The reserve is meadow-steppe and forest steppe, known for wildflowers, feather grass, fescue and other grasses.  Many parts are recovering from the influences of humans, particularly hay-making, and are the subject of scientific study of the processes of rebuilding wild plant and animal communities.

Public use
As a strict nature reserve, Michael's Reserve's primary purpose is protection of nature and scientific study.  Public access is limited: mass recreation and construction of facilities is prohibited as are hunting and fishing.

See also
 Lists of Nature Preserves of Ukraine (class Ia protected areas)
 National Parks of Ukraine (class II protected areas)

References

External links
 Map of Michael's Virgin Land Reserve on OpenStreetMap.org

Nature reserves in Ukraine